Symphyotrichum eulae (formerly Aster eulae) is a species of flowering plant in the family Asteraceae endemic to Texas. Commonly known as Eula's aster, it is a perennial, herbaceous plant that may reach  in height. Its flowers have usually white to bluish or lavender-white ray florets and yellow then reddish to brown disk florets. It was named for Eula Whitehouse, American botanist, botanical illustrator, and plant collector.

Citations

References

eulae
Flora of Texas
Plants described in 1950
Taxa named by Lloyd Herbert Shinners